Mount Washington Presbyterian Church was a former church located on Broadway and Dyckman Street in Inwood, Manhattan, New York City. It was built in 1844 and  enlarged 1856. It was a fine example of a timber Carpenter Gothic church with crenellated tower and spire. The church was demolished sometime before its publication (1967) in Lost New York.

References 

Churches in Manhattan
Churches completed in 1844
20th-century churches in the United States
Victorian architecture in New York City
Carpenter Gothic church buildings in New York (state)
Closed churches in New York City
Demolished churches in New York City
Demolished buildings and structures in Manhattan
Inwood, Manhattan